Henri Hennequin (born 13 September 1898, date of death unknown) was a French racing cyclist. He rode in the 1926 Tour de France.

References

1898 births
Year of death missing
French male cyclists